Events in the year 1891 in Iceland.

Incumbents 

 Monarch: Christian IX
 Minister for Iceland: Johannes Nellemann

Events 

 Icelandic Police begin operating in places outside of Reykjavík.

Deaths 

 19 August – Gestur Pálsson, writer (b. 1852)

References 

 
1890s in Iceland
Years of the 19th century in Iceland
Iceland
Iceland